Malayotyphlops koekkoeki, also known commonly as Koekkoek's blind snake or the Boenjoe Island worm snake, is a species of snake in the family Typhlopidae.

Etymology
The specific name, koekkoeki, is in honor of Dutch scientific illustrator Marinus Adrianus Koekkoek (1873-1944).

Geographic range
M. koekkoeki is found on the Indonesian island of Bunyu off the northeastern coast of Borneo.

Reproduction
M. koekkoeki is oviparous.

References

Further reading
Brongersma LD (1934). "Contributions to Indo-Australian Herpetology". Zoologische Mededeelingen 17: 161–251. (Typhlops koekkoeki, new species, pp. 186–187 + Figures 13–15 on p. 190).
Hedges, S. Blair; Marion, Angela B.; Lipp, Kelly M.; Marin, Julie; Vidal, Nicolas (2014). "A taxonomic framework for typhlopid snakes from the Caribbean and other regions (Reptilia, Squamata)". Caribbean Herpetology (49): 1-61. (Malayotyphlops koekoeki, new combination).

koekkoeki
Reptiles described in 1934
Taxa named by Leo Brongersma